Stethorus utilis is a species of lady beetle in the family Coccinellidae. It is found in North America.

References

Further reading

 

Coccinellidae
Beetles of North America
Beetles described in 1895
Taxa named by George Henry Horn
Articles created by Qbugbot